The Legendary Ranger (Yuan Zhen-xia) is a 1993 Hong Kong cross-genre television miniseries produced by Mui Siu-ching and aired by TVB. The series starred  Leon Lai, Michelle Reis and Catherine Hung, and featured a supporting cast of veteran actors, stars, and future stars, including Faye Wong and Athena Chu. It is based on Ni Kuang's fictional surgeon/adventurer Yuan Zhen-xia and is set in the Wisely fictional universe, a setting  in which extraterrestrial aliens, magic and wuxia heroes co-exist.

At the time Leon Lai was at the beginning of the Four Heavenly Kings period of his career and the series' was filmed and edited, especially the fight scenes, with a pop video sensibility. The series cross-genre setting and visual aesthetic was at the time groundbreaking in comparison to the historical costume wuxia that Hong Kong audiences were used to.

Plot
Yuan Zhen-xia is a top class surgeon, amateur detective and martial artist with an insatiable curiosity and the moral code of the traditional youxia. His curiosity draws him into investigating a slew of seemingly unrelated kidnappings and other bizarre crimes. However, as Yuan investigates deeper he discovers all the crimes are in fact linked and are part of a plot by a doomsday cult. Convinced that mankind is due to be wiped out by an extraterrestrial source, the cult's crimes are carried out to hide and fund the theft of genetic material from the brightest and fittest human specimens in order to create a master race with which to repopulate the earth. Despite becoming an implacable enemy of the cult, as an example of what the cult considers to be a perfect human, Yuan himself becomes a prime candidate for recruitment into the cult. To this end the cult sends its top agent, the beautiful model/actress Huang Juan to recruit Yuan.

Despite its illegal activities the cult's crimes are carried out in a perverted desire to protect humanity and to ensure its survival. Yuan discovers his true enemy is someone closer to home. Jin Shí, an adventuring companion of Yuan, a fellow surgeon and martial artist, becomes frustrated at always coming second best to Yuan, especially in the pursuit of the love of the dancer Lan Ling. Twisted by his own inferiority complex, Jin sets out to gain his revenge against Yuan, by destroying all that Yuan loves, starting with Lan Ling.

Cast

References

Character names and broadcast dates taken from the Chinese article of this subject

TVB dramas
1990s Hong Kong television series
1993 Hong Kong television series debuts
1993 Hong Kong television series endings
Hong Kong science fiction television series
Hong Kong wuxia television series
Cantonese-language television shows